Hartenstein may refer to:

Places 
Hartenstein, Saxony, a town in Saxony, Germany
Hartenstein, Bavaria, a municipality in the district of Nürnberger Land in Bavaria, Germany
several castles in Germany
Hartenstein, Austria, a castle in Austria
, a castle in the Czech Republic
Hartenstein, Slovenia, a castle in Slovenia's Kozje region

Other uses 
Hartenstein (surname)

See also
Hertenstein (disambiguation)